Thonzonium bromide is a monocationic detergent. A solution of it is thus a surfactant and a detergent that promotes tissue contact by dispersion and penetration of the cellular debris and exudate of the containing solution.

It is used in cortisporin-TC ear drops to help penetration of active ingredients through cellular debris for its antibacterial action.

References

Aminopyrimidines
Quaternary ammonium compounds
Cationic surfactants